The AC-9 was one of two Southern Pacific Railroad's articulated steam locomotive classes that ran smokebox forward after 1920.  Twelve AC-9 class locomotives were built by Lima in 1939 and were Southern Pacific's largest and heaviest steam engines, partly a consequence of low quality coal these engines were designed to burn. The AC-9s were partially streamlined (the only articulated steam engines to be so equipped), having "skyline casings" inspired by Lima's GS series of 4-8-4's, also made for Southern Pacific, and were equipped with coal tenders, unlike the cab forwards.  The wheel arrangement was 2-8-8-4, which was nicknamed "Yellowstone". Between 1939 and 1953, all the twelve AC-9 engines were in service between Tucumcari, New Mexico, El Paso, Texas, and Tucson, Arizona, where they mainly pulled freight trains and occasionally also passenger trains such as the Golden State Limited. Between May and August 1950, they were converted to burn oil instead of coal, and in spring 1953 eleven of them moved to Southern Pacific's Modoc line between Sparks, Nevada, and Alturas, California, where they worked in freight service from 1953 until retirement in early summer 1956. None were preserved. All were scrapped in 1956 with none survived to preservation.

External links
 The Yellowstone Type Locomotive

Steam locomotives of the United States
AC-09
2-8-8-4 locomotives
Lima locomotives
Simple articulated locomotives
Railway locomotives introduced in 1939
Freight locomotives
Scrapped locomotives
Standard gauge locomotives of the United States